This article displays the qualifying draw for men's singles at the 2014 French Open.

Seeds

  Paolo Lorenzi (qualified)
  Julian Reister (second round)
  Evgeny Donskoy (second round)
  Blaž Rola (qualifying competition)
  Go Soeda (first round, retired)
  Andreas Haider-Maurer (qualified)
  Tim Smyczek (qualifying competition)
  Diego Schwartzman (qualified)
  Peter Gojowczyk (second round, retired)
  Michael Berrer (second round)
  Malek Jaziri (second round)
  Andrey Kuznetsov (qualifying competition)
  Denis Kudla (first round)
  Guido Pella (second round)
  Blaž Kavčič (second round)
  Frank Dancevic (qualifying competition)
  Horacio Zeballos (second round)
  Andreas Beck (qualified)
  Damir Džumhur (qualified)
  Thiemo de Bakker (first round)
  Ryan Harrison (second round)
  Daniel Evans (first round)
  Tatsuma Ito (first round)
  Adrian Ungur (first round)
  Máximo González (second round)
  Ričardas Berankis (qualifying competition, withdrew)
  Peter Polansky (qualified)
  Samuel Groth (qualifying competition)
  Yuichi Sugita (first round)
  Gerald Melzer (second round)
  Marsel İlhan (second round)
  Facundo Bagnis (qualified)

Qualifiers

Qualifying draw

First qualifier

Second qualifier

Third qualifier

Fourth qualifier

Fifth qualifier

Sixth qualifier

Seventh qualifier

Eighth qualifier

Ninth qualifier

Tenth qualifier

Eleventh qualifier

Twelfth qualifier

Thirteenth qualifier

Fourteenth qualifier

Fifteenth qualifier

Sixteenth qualifier

References
 Qualifying Draw
2014 French Open – Men's draws and results at the International Tennis Federation

Men's Singles Qualifying
French Open - Men's Singles Qualifying
French Open by year – Qualifying